This is the list of bridges located in Estonia. The list is incomplete.

References 

 
Estonia
Bridges
Bridges